Bashmakovo is an urban locality (a work settlement) and the administrative center of Bashmakovsky District of Penza Oblast, Russia, located  from Penza. Population:

History
Bashmakovo's history dates back to the villages of Kolesovka and Mikhaylovka established in the mid-18th century. Later, the two villages were merged and formed what now is Bashkmakovo. It was named in honor of Sergey Bashmakov, who was one of the leaders in the construction of the railway.

Economy
Bashmakovo had been connected with Moscow by train since 1875. The inhabitants are mainly involved in the production and processing of agricultural products and produce oil and brine cheese.

References

Urban-type settlements in Penza Oblast